Thomas or Tom Hicks may refer to:

Sports
Thomas Hicks (bobsleigh) (1918–1992), American bobsledder who won a bronze medal at the 1948 Winter Olympics
Thomas Hicks (athlete) (1876–1952), American athlete who won the marathon gold medal at the 1904 Summer Olympics
Tom Hicks (cricketer) (born 1979), English cricketer
Tom Hicks (American football) (born 1952), American football player 
Tom Hicks (rugby union) (born 1991), British rugby player
Thomas Hicks (tennis) (1869–1956), Australian tennis player and administrator

Others
Thomas Holliday Hicks (1798–1865), U.S. senator and governor of Maryland
Tom Hicks (born 1946), American businessman from Texas
Thomas O. Hicks Jr., American businessman from Texas
Tommy Steele (Thomas Willam Hicks, born 1936), British entertainer
Thomas Hicks (painter) (1823–1890), American painter
Thomas W. Hicks, Under Secretary of the Navy